Some Tame Gazelle is Barbara Pym's first novel, originally published in 1950.

The title of the book is taken from the poem "Something to Love" by Thomas Haynes Bayly, and the work of other English poets is frequently referenced during the course of the story. First started during Pym's period studying at Oxford University, it contains many sly references to those she knew there.

Plot
The novel details episodes in the life of Belinda Bede, a spinster now in her fifties who shares a house with her younger, more dominant but equally unmarried sister Harriet. Since her university days, Belinda has loved the village's Archdeacon Hoccleve, with whom she studied then, although he had preferred to marry the better connected Agatha, a bishop's daughter. Harriet's preference has always been to look after the welfare of young curates, although her admirer in the village is the Italian Count  Ricardo Bianco, who regularly proposes marriage to her.

At the time the story begins, Mr Donne is the newly arrived curate in the village. Eventually he becomes engaged to Olivia Berridge, an academic specialising in Middle English literature and a niece of Agatha Hoccleve. But in the meantime, Agatha leaves for a visit to a German spa and another of Belinda's and the Archdeacon's student acquaintances comes to stay at the vicarage. This is Dr Parnell, now head of the main university library, who is accompanied by his assistant, the socially suspect Mr Mold. Before leaving again, Mr Mold proposes marriage to Harriet and, refused, takes it calmly by visiting the local pub and counting himself well escaped.

When Agatha returns, she brings home Dr Grote, the colonial bishop of Mbawawa, a former protégé of Harriet's during the time when he was once a curate. Belinda begins to see in him another threat to her peaceful coexistence with her sister, but it is to herself that the bishop proposes in the end. When he too is rejected, he proposes instead to Connie Aspinall, a decayed gentlewoman living in the same village.

Harmony returns to the disrupted community at last with the marriage of Mr Donne and Olivia Berridge and their subsequent departure. As life returns to normal, a new curate arrives to claim Harriet's attention while Belinda finds "such consolation as she needed in our greater English poets", in gardening and good works.

Publication history
Pym initially wrote Some Tame Gazelle in 1934 while studying at St Hilda's College, Oxford. However the novel was rejected by several publishers including Jonathan Cape and Gollancz. Cape expressed interest in Pym's writing, however, and encouraged her to make some alterations to the text and consider re-submitting. Pym's friend, the up-and-coming literary critic Robert Liddell, provided detailed criticism of the novel to assist with edits.

World War II interrupted Pym's budding literary career, and she finally revised the novel to the point where it was accepted by Cape in 1950. The novel sold 3,544 copies in Great Britain by the end of the 1950s, which was not a bestselling figure but was reasonable for a debut novelist. Among alternative titles that Pym considered were Some Sad Turtle and The Well Tam'd Heart.

The novel was first published in the United States by E.P. Dutton in 1983. In 2012, it was released as an audiobook by Hachette. Some Tame Gazelle was published in Italy as Qualcuno da amare (Someone to love) and in France with the title literally translated as Comme une gazelle apprivoisée.

Reception
The novel received several positive reviews. The Manchester Guardian called it "an enchanting book about village life" while Antonia White reviewed the novel for the New Statesman:

It has been considered a remarkable first novel, because of the way in which the youthful Pym — who began the book while still a student — imagined herself into the situation of a middle-aged spinster, living with her sister in the country. The poet Philip Larkin regarded Some Tame Gazelle as Pym's Pride and Prejudice

Characters
Two months after she had begun work on the first draft in 1934, Barbara Pym noted in her diary that "Some time in July I began writing a story about Hilary and me as spinsters of fiftyish.  Henry, Jock and all of us appeared in it." There exists a first edition of its much edited final version annotated in the author's hand with a pencilled list identifying the characters based on her friends and associates. A later scholar has therefore drawn the conclusion that originally Some Tame Gazelle "was to be a roman à clef for her particular circle".

Besides herself and her sister Hilary, who are the characters Belinda and Harriet Bede, many others with whom Barbara Pym had associated at Oxford were included, sometimes under revealing names. Henry Harvey, her (and Belinda's) abiding love interest, is transformed into Archdeacon Hoccleve; the Archdeacon's wife Agatha is identified with, not the woman that Henry eventually married, but Alison West–Watson, a more successful girlfriend than was Barbara. Three of the characters were based on former librarians at the Bodleian at one time or another, although the library itself is never identified by name in the novel. Principal among them was Robert Liddell, nicknamed "Jock" as in the diary entry, who is Dr Nicholas Parnell, the former university friend who comes to stay with the Archdeacon. The other two librarians were Count Roberto Weiss and John Barnicot, who become the novel's Count Ricardo Bianco and his dead friend John Akenside. Two more women also had real-life counterparts. Edith Liversidge was based on Honor Tracy, once Liddell's love interest, while Lady Clara Boulding has been identified with Lady Julia Pakenham, a daughter of the 5th Earl of Longford.

All through her life, Barbara Pym recorded odd names that pleased or amused her – for example, a cathedral organist named A. Surplice. A roman à clef like Some Kind Gazelle gave her full scope for a range of private jokes of that kind. The Bede sisters, who gain excitement from so small a village event as the departure of the vicar's wife watched from behind bedroom curtains, are given the same surname as the ecclesiastical historian, The Venerable Bede. And Dr Theo Grote, who gives slide-lectures on the Mbawawa people, shares his name with George Grote, author of the voluminous History of Greece.

Then, in a novel where so much is made of "our greater poets", the characters bear the name of several. The Augustan poets Thomas Parnell and Matthew Prior give their names to the librarian Dr Parnell and the dressmaker Miss Prior. Other 18th century literary names include Akenside, that of the Count's letter-writing friend, and Piozzi, which was the name given the Count in Pym's original manuscript before the editors at Cape made her change it. Edgar Donne, who pronounces his name as Don, is embarrassed by the Archdeacon's insistence that it should be pronounced like the poet John Donne’s as Dunne. The Archdeacon himself also has a poet's name, that of Thomas Chaucer's disciple Thomas Hoccleve, and quotes both John Gower and Chaucer to an uncomprehending congregation in his sermons. The humour is further underlined by his wife and her niece both being more erudite students of Middle English literature.

Pym's characters were thereafter to recur in minor roles in later novels. Archdeacon Hoccleve featured in Excellent Women and A Glass of Blessings. Harriet Bede reappeared in An Unsuitable Attachment, in which Count Bianco's death is also reported.

Adaptation
Some Tame Gazelle was adapted as a radio play by BBC Radio 4 in 1995 with Miriam Margolyes as Harriet and Hannah Gordon as Belinda.

Notes

Bibliography
Yvonne Cocking,  Who’s Who in Some Tame Gazelle (2016)</ref>

1950 British novels
Novels by Barbara Pym
Novels set in Oxfordshire
Jonathan Cape books
1950 debut novels